Call of the Sea is a 1930 British adventure film directed by Leslie S Hiscott.

Plot
Lt. Cmdr. Good (Edwards) is a naval officer who goes on an extensive search for his long-lost friend who mysteriously disappeared on a tropical island

Cast
Henry Edwards as Lt Cmdr. Good
Chrissie White as Iris Tares
Bernard Nedell as Ramon Tares
Chili Bouchier as Poquita
Clifford McLaglen as Pedro
Alexander Field as Hooky Walker

References

External links

 

1930 films
British adventure films
1930 adventure films
1930s English-language films
Films directed by Leslie S. Hiscott
British black-and-white films
Warner Bros. films
1930s British films